Xpeak is a standard for device management, based on XML and platform agnostic, initially focused on financial applications but not restricted to it. It serves the same purpose that other APIs like CEN/XFS and J/XFS but is not restricted to one operating system or language, since it works in a client/server model using XML in a way to homogenise the communication between the application and the device services. Its flexibility allows different parts of the whole business to be implemented in different languages, having the application and the various devices, some implemented in Java, other in C++ and still others in the device's firmware.

It was designed based on the experiences had with CEN/XFS, J/XFS and JavaPOS, but instead of using a standards organization it uses and open source model to develop the architecture and tools used by the project, like its base the complete open source software solution named Xpeaker. This way  it can be updated, quickly and openly, by the users themselves, using the Internet as the means of communication rather than meetings requiring a physical presence.

Xpeak follows the open source model and participation in the project is totally free, but it is moderated by the R&D Open Source Foundation, participated in equal parts by Sun Microsystems and Intecna. The initial code contribution is the responsibility of Cashware, one of the leading companies in devices connectivity through the use of standards (CEN/XFS and J/XFS).

Xpeaker 
Xpeaker is a collection of software projects, integrally developed by Cashware, with the philosophy of Open Source and commercialized under a dual license the XPEAKER PUBLIC LICENSE and a commercial licence.
Xpeaker includes the following elements:

Xpeaker IDE
An Eclipse Plugin which permits: 
 Tests on the devices compatible with Xpeak to be carried out
 Designs Forms
 Deployment
 Shares code

Xpeaker Services
Made up of:
A set of basic classes for the development of Xpeak Services in Java.
A collection of real device Services, including cash dispensers and recyclers, card readers, cheque readers, printers, bar code readers, etc.

Xpeaking
High level API for access to Xpeak Services.
Xpeaking permits access to said services from different programming languages (Java, C, C++, C#, Pascal)

External links 
 Xpeak Home Page
 Documentation on Xpeaker Installation
 Xpeaking for Java Examples

References

Device drivers
Banking terms
Embedded systems
Application programming interfaces
Banking technology
XML software